Challenge is a 2017 Indian Bhojpuri language action film directed by Satish Jain and starring Pawan Singh, Madhu Sharma, Samir Aftab. It was produced by Abhay Sinha's Yashi Films Pvt Ltd.

Cast

 Pawan Singh
 Madhu Sharma
 Samir Aftab
 Raj Premi
 Shivika Diwan
 Ehsaan Khan
 Maya Yadav
 Mehnaaz Shroff

References

External links
 

2017 films
Indian action films
2010s Hindi-language films
2017 action films
2010s Bhojpuri-language films
2017 multilingual films
Indian multilingual films
Hindi-language action films